"Faster Kill Pussycat" is the first single from British producer Oakenfold's second studio album, A Lively Mind (2006). The song features American actress Brittany Murphy's vocals and was co-written by singer-songwriter Kelli Ali (former vocalist of British trip hop group Sneaker Pimps). The title of the track is a play on the title of the movie Faster, Pussycat! Kill! Kill!.

"Faster Kill Pussycat" peaked at number seven on the UK Singles Chart in June 2006, becoming Murphy's highest-charting single in Britain. Outside the United Kingdom, the single reached number one on the US Billboard Hot Dance Club Play chart and number two on the Billboard Hot Dance Airplay chart. It also peaked within the top 20 on the charts of Ireland and New Zealand.

Music video
The music video, shot on the rooftop of a parking garage in downtown Los Angeles, features Brittany Murphy dancing, with scenes of Oakenfold as a DJ and a wild crowd. Directed by renowned music video director Jake Nava, it premiered on television in May 2006, and received airplay on MTV and other music channels. It was also a pre-loaded video on Microsoft's Zune.

Track listings

US maxi-CD single
 "Faster Kill Pussycat" (album mix) – 3:14
 "Faster Kill Pussycat" (Roman Hunter mix) – 5:53
 "Faster Kill Pussycat" (club mix) – 7:53
 "Faster Kill Pussycat" (Nat Monday mix) – 6:51
 "Faster Kill Pussycat" (Liam Shachar mix) – 7:28
 "Faster Kill Pussycat" (Eddie Baez's Future Disco mix) – 8:42

US 12-inch single
A1. "Faster Kill Pussycat" (Roman Hunter mix) – 7:57
A2. "Faster Kill Pussycat" (club mix) – 5:53
B1. "Faster Kill Pussycat" (Nat Monday mix) – 6:51
B2. "Faster Kill Pussycat" (Liam Shachar mix) – 7:28

US digital download
 "Faster Kill Pussycat" – 3:13
 "Faster Kill Pussycat" (Roman Hunter mix) – 7:57
 "Faster Kill Pussycat" (club mix) – 5:53
 "Faster Kill Pussycat" (Nat Monday mix) – 6:52
 "Faster Kill Pussycat" (Liam Shachar mix) – 7:27
 "Faster Kill Pussycat" (Eddie Baez's Future Disco edit) – 4:36

UK and Australian CD single
 "Faster Kill Pussycat" (radio mix)
 "Faster Kill Pussycat" (club mix)
 "Faster Kill Pussycat" (Roman Hunter mix)
 "Faster Kill Pussycat" (Nat Monday mix)
 "Faster Kill Pussycat" (Liam Shacar mix)
 "Faster Kill Pussycat" (hip hop mix)

UK 12-inch single
A1. "Faster Kill Pussycat" (Roman Hunter mix)
A2. "Faster Kill Pussycat" (radio mix)
B1. "Faster Kill Pussycat" (Nat Monday mix)
B2. "Faster Kill Pussycat" (Liam Shachar mix)

Personnel
 Writing: Paul Oakenfold, Ian Green, Kelli Ali
 Production: Paul Oakenfold
 Vocals: Brittany Murphy
 Additional production and programming: Ian Green

Chart performance
Following the death of Brittany Murphy in December 2009, the song re-entered at number seven on the UK Dance Chart. The song also entered the UK Indie Chart on the same week, reaching number 13.

Weekly charts

Year-end charts

Release history

See also
 List of number-one dance singles of 2006 (U.S.)

References

2006 singles
2006 songs
EMI Records singles
Maverick Records singles
Music videos directed by Jake Nava
Paul Oakenfold songs
Song recordings produced by Paul Oakenfold
Songs written by Paul Oakenfold